Emma Sheerin (born 1991/92) is an Irish Sinn Féin politician from Derry, Northern Ireland. Since 2018 she has been MLA for Mid Ulster.

Background
Sheerin is a native of Ballinascreen where she attended St Colm's High School.  She then proceeded to Queen's University, Belfast where she obtained a degree in Politics.

Political career

For several years, Sheerin was a member of and Sinn Féin's Cúige Uladh Officer Board and the Ard Chomhairle.

Aged 26, she was selected to take Ian Milne's seat in the Northern Ireland Assembly for Mid Ulster. She was later named as Equality Spokesperson.

Personal life
Sheerin lives in Ballinascreen.

References

External links

Living people
Northern Ireland MLAs 2017–2022
People from County Londonderry
Female members of the Northern Ireland Assembly
Sinn Féin MLAs
1991 births
Northern Ireland MLAs 2022–2027
Alumni of Queen's University Belfast